Joseph Albert Rosario "Lolo" Couture (July 24, 1905 – March 1, 1986) was a professional ice hockey player. Couture was a right winger who played for the Chicago Black Hawks and the Montreal Canadiens from 1928 to 1936.

Born in St. Boniface, Manitoba, Couture began his NHL career in 1928 with the Chicago Black Hawks. He would play for them until the end of the 1935 season. He helped the Blackhawks win the Stanley Cup in 1934.

After brief stops in the minor leagues with the London Tecumsehs of the IHL and the Providence Reds of the CAHL He played the 1935–36 NHL season with the Montreal Canadiens.

He and fellow Blackhawk Leroy Goldsworthy identified the body of teammate Jack Leswick, who died in mysterious circumstances. Couture died in Winnipeg, Manitoba in 1986 and is buried in St. Boniface Cathedral.

Awards and achievements
Stanley Cup Championships (1934)
“Honoured Member” of the Manitoba Hockey Hall of Fame

References

External links

 Rosario "Lolo" Couture Match Cover design in the Metropolitan Museum of Art

1905 births
1986 deaths
Canadian ice hockey right wingers
Chicago Blackhawks players
Ice hockey people from Winnipeg
Montreal Canadiens players
People from Saint Boniface, Winnipeg
St. Boniface Canadiens players
Stanley Cup champions
Winnipeg Hockey Club players
Winnipeg Maroons players
Burials at Saint Boniface Cathedral